Fuller Craft Museum is an arts and crafts museum in the city of Brockton, Massachusetts, 25 miles south of Boston. It receives 20,000 visitors a year. It contains contemporary craft-based art of many different genres and origins. It is the only craft museum in the New England area. The museum was founded in 1946.

Exhibits
The permanent collection at Fuller Craft Museum includes studio furniture, as well as glass, ceramics, jewelry and wood or textiles. Many craft artists are included in the permanent collection. The outdoor permanent sculpture features materials from nature. The museum has an outdoor courtyard.

The museum also hosts temporary exhibits, such as displays of polymer clay sculptures, fantasy teapots, an exhibit on the meaning of shoes, and a current display of Native American basket weaving. It pairs with a local high school to offer weaving and ceramics lessons for special needs students.

History
Fuller Craft Museum was made possible by Myron Fuller, who in August 1946, set up a trust fund for an art center to be educational in nature. Fuller was a native of Brockton and was a geologist and a hydrologist. During his career, he amassed a small fortune. From his accumulated wealth, Fuller set aside the sum of one million dollars, to establish the art museum and cultural center in memory of his family. It was previously known as the Fuller Memorial Museum of Art School.

Location and environment
The Museum building was created by architects J.T. Anderson and Associates of Boston. Fuller Craft is filled with high ceilings, wide corridors, slate floors, natural wood beams and myriad floor to ceiling windows that provide an abundance of natural light. Fine craft is exhibited in the galleries as well as outside where various sculptures appear at almost every turn in the Museum's architectural courtyards and outdoor sculpture garden. Integrating the Museum's architectural elements with the natural environment creates a unique atmosphere where visitors will discover a seamless transition from indoors to outdoors and vice versa.  This design and the reciprocity between art and nature that it creates was inspired by the work of Danish architects, Jorgen Bo and Vilhelm Wohlert and what many consider to be one of the most significant buildings of the 20th century, Louisiana Museum of Modern Art in Copenhagen.

The Museum is located next to the D.W. Field Park in Brockton, Massachusetts. It pairs with a local high school to offer weaving and ceramics lessons for special needs students.

References

External links

Museums in Plymouth County, Massachusetts
1946 establishments in Massachusetts
Buildings and structures in Brockton, Massachusetts
Art museums and galleries in Massachusetts
Contemporary crafts museums in the United States
Art museums established in 1946